National Tertiary Route 922, or just Route 922 (or ) is a National Road Route of Costa Rica, located in the Guanacaste province.

Description
In Guanacaste province the route covers Bagaces canton (Bagaces district).

References

Highways in Costa Rica